Arjun is a 1985 Indian Hindi-language action film directed by Rahul Rawail and starring Sunny Deol and Dimple Kapadia. 

The film is about a young educated but unemployed man named Arjun Malvankar (Sunny Deol) from a lower middle class Maharashtrian family in Mumbai. He has a group of friends who are also unemployed. They are all frustrated with the system that thrives on corruption and exploitation of the weak.

The film was later remade in Tamil as Sathyaa, in Telugu as Bharatamlo Arjunudu, in Kannada as Sangrama.and in Sinhala as Suranimala The rights to this film are owned by Shah Rukh Khan's Red Chillies Entertainment. Sukanya Verma of Rediff.com called it Deol's best action film.

Plot
 
Unemployed but tolerant and kind-hearted Arjun Malvankar stays in the suburbs of Bombay with his father and stepmother and stepsister. Mr. Malvankar still works at an old age to make both ends meet.

One day, Arjun beats up a group of ruffians who are thrashing a poor man for not paying extortion taxes. With this incident, Arjun's life changes. Arjun invokes the wrath of the local goon, who orders more people to go and beat him, but this time he is assisted by five of his friends, Arjun beats them up badly and sends them back. The goons warn Arjun's parents to advise him against his activities, lest he gets himself killed. Arjun is arrested but let off with a warning by the cops. However, a new inspector, Ravi Rane, notes that Arjun is actually doing the right thing. He later falls in love with Arjun's sister.

Arjun is approached by Geeta, a journalist who asks him for a favour which he obliges, and after which they both fall in love with each other.

The minister Deen Dayal Trivedi, who is behind all illegal activities in the city, and who is also supporting the don, gets to know of Arjun. He thinks that Arjun is working for his rival Shiv Kumar Chowgule, whose party is trying to get nominated for the upcoming elections, and orders that he and his friends should be eliminated. The gang attacks and kills one of Arjun's friends, Mohan, in public. Though Arjun tries his best, no one comes forward to give witness to the murder out of fear, because of which the killers are left free. Arjun goes and beats up the killers till he is stopped by police.

Now Arjun is approached by Shiv Kumar Chowgule and his right-hand man, Babu Ram, but is simply turned down. Soon Arjun's family kicks him out of the house, and with nowhere to go, he agrees to go with Chowgule, thinking that the latter is an honest and upright person trying to eliminate the wicked Trivedi and all his activities in the city. With Arjun to help him, Chowgule destroys all of Trivedi's activities. He breaks up Trivedi's Matka den operated by his trusted aides, Anoop. He also manages to lay hold of Anand Patkar, a wealthy alcoholic who is part of the nomination committee for elections and on Trivedi's side. The enraged Trivedi orders Anoop to murder Anand, which he does but unfortunately gets caught red handed by police.

The film takes a twist when Arjun sees that Chowgule has joined hands with Trivedi and that none of the evidence he collected has really been published anywhere, as promised by Chowgule. He realizes that a politician is a corrupt person who was using him for his own gains. The car and house given to Arjun are also confiscated.

Frustrated and angered, Arjun goes to fight the politicians at their speech rally but is simply thrown out. At home with Geeta, Arjun is visited by his father, who tells him that all his life he has borne wrongdoings and injustice. He blesses his son, telling him that he is with him in the fight against injustice.

The film then reaches its climax, where Arjun breaks into Trivedi's house and beats him up, then proceeds to Chowgule's mansion, where he beats up the politician and takes away all the files and evidence of both Chowgule's and Trivedi's bad activities. However, wounded Chowgule orders his men to chase Arjun and kill him. Arjun is now on the run in the empty streets of Bombay at night, with goons hot on his heels. They manage to shoot him a couple of times, but Arjun still runs. He manages to evade them, causing their vehicles to crash, until finally he kills the last goon and arrives at Inspector Ravi's Police station, where he collapses and gives him the evidence. Chowgule and Trivedi are finally arrested.

The film ends with Ravi giving Arjun a thumbs up in hospital.

Cast

Sunny Deol as Arjun Malvankar
Dimple Kapadia as Geeta Sahni 
Raj Kiran as Inspector Ravi Rane
Supriya Pathak as  Sudha Malvankar / Sudha Rane
Prem Chopra as Minister Dindayal Trivedi
Anupam Kher as Shivkumar Chaugle
Paresh Rawal as Anup Lal
Goga Kapoor as Ranga
A. K. Hangal as Mr. Malvankar
Shashikala as Mrs. Rukmini Malvankar
Shafi Inamdar as Anand Patkar
Raja Bundela as Chander
Satyajeet as Mohan
Annu Kapoor as Baburam
Dev Kumar as Black Mailer to Anand Patkar

Music
The music of this film was composed by R. D. Burman. The background music, especially during the action scenes was very catchy and was used for several other movies. The song "Mammaiya Kero Mamma" was very popular.

Javed Akhtar had written the lyrics.

Awards
33rd Filmfare Awards:
Nominated
Best Film – Cineyug Films
Best Director – Rahul Rawail
Best Story – Javed Akhtar

References

External links 
 

1985 action films
1980s Hindi-language films
1985 films
Films directed by Rahul Rawail
Films scored by R. D. Burman
Hindi films remade in other languages
Indian action drama films